The Heartland Championship competition, known for sponsorship reasons as the Bunnings Warehouse Heartland Championship, is a domestic rugby union competition in New Zealand. It was founded in 2006 as one of two successor competitions to the country's former domestic competition, the National Provincial Championship (NPC). The country's 27 provincial teams were split into two separate competitions. Thirteen of the original teams, plus one merged side created from two other teams, entered the new top-level professional competition, the Air New Zealand Cup (later known as the ITM Cup, Mitre 10 Cup and currently the NPC). The remaining 12 sides entered the new Heartland Championship, whose teams contest two distinct trophies, both named after famous New Zealand players:

 The Meads Cup, the more prestigious trophy, named after Colin Meads.
 The Lochore Cup, named after Brian Lochore.

Format 

The Heartland Championship is held annually, and starts in August. Rugby teams from 12 provincial unions compete.

Points are earned during the competition based on the following schedule:

 4 points for a win
 2 points for a draw
 0 points for a loss
 1 bonus point for scoring 4 or more tries, regardless of the final result
 1 bonus point for a loss by 7 points or less

Prior to 2011 
Prior to the 2011 Competition, the tournament was conducted in three rounds. This was similar to the structure of the 2006 Air New Zealand Cup, but that competition collapsed its first two phases into one effective in 2007. At the start of Round One, the 12 teams would split into seeded pools of six teams each, Pool A and Pool B. Seedings were also based on positions in the previous year's competition. During Round One, each team would play the other teams in its pool once. All teams would have either two or three home fixtures, with the three highest seeds in each pool at the start of the season receiving the extra home fixture.

All teams would advance to Round Two. The top three teams in each pool advance to the Meads Cup, while the bottom three teams enter the Lochore Cup.

Round two saw each team in both the Meads and Lochore Cups playing the three teams that it did not play during Round One. The three teams with the most competition points in Round One would play two home fixtures and one away, while the other three teams would play one home fixture and two away.

All competition points from Round One carried over to Round Two, and the competition points earned in both rounds determined the teams that advanced to the semifinals of each Cup in Round Three. The top four teams in the Meads and Lochore Cup competitions at the end of Round Two advanced to the semifinals.

Round Robin 
This round sees the 12 teams playing 8 games each. 1st to 4th on the ladder at the end of the 8 weeks will play off for the Meads Cup, while 5th to 8th play off for the Lochore Cup.

Finals 
The Meads and Lochore Cup winners are both determined in four-team single-elimination tournaments. The semifinal matchups are seeded 1-4 and 2-3, with the higher seed receiving home field advantage. The highest surviving seed hosts each Cup final.

Teams 
The Heartland Championship is contested by the following teams:

Prior to 2006, East Coast, North Otago, Poverty Bay and Wanganui competed in Division Two of the NPC, alongside Counties-Manukau, Hawke's Bay, Manawatu, Nelson Bays and Marlborough (all promoted to the Air New Zealand Cup, Nelson Bays and Marlborough merging to form Tasman). The remaining teams competed in Division Three of the NPC.

Champions

Meads Cup winners

Lochore Cup winners

Osborne Taonga

In 2021 a new challenger trophy for the Heartland Championship teams, named after 16-test All Black Bill Osborne was announced.  It would follow similar rules to the Ranfurly Shield.

The Osborne Taonga was designed and created by Otaki-based Kaiwhakaairo (carver) and artist Jason Hina (Ngā Rauru Kiitahi, Te Atihaunui ā Pāpārangi, Ngāti Apa, Ngāpuhi, Ngāti Kauwhata and Ngāti Raukawa) and fellow carver Bill Doyle, who created the Tū Kotahi Aotearoa trophy.

Ian Kirkpatrick Medal

From 2022, the Heartland Championship Player of the Year award will be awarded a medal named after the former All Blacks captain, Ian Kirkpatrick.

Heartland Championship representative team 
Each year a New Zealand Heartland XV is selected to recognise the top performing players in the Championship.  The team selected plays various fixtures and in some years goes on an overseas tour.

See also 
 National Provincial Championship (1976–2005)
 National Provincial Championship (2006–present)
 List of New Zealand rugby union teams
 Hanan Shield

References

External links 
 NZ Heartland Website
 Official Heartland Championship Website

 
3
National Provincial Championship
Professional sports leagues in New Zealand